Jeffry B. Lansman (born 1951 in Miami Beach, Florida) is an American neuroscientist, Professor Emeritus of Cellular and Molecular Pharmacology in the School of Medicine at the University of California, San Francisco and a member of the Graduate Program in Neuroscience, Weill Institute of Neuroscience, and Cardiovascular Research Institute.

Lansman is known for his fundamental research on calcium channels in nerve and muscle and their role in normal physiology and in disease. His early work on marine invertebrates identified the ion channels that produce the rhythmic beating of the heart. While working at Yale School of Medicine with RW Tsien and P Hess, he discovered the L- and T-type channels in heart muscle that control heart rate and contractility. He subsequently identified ion channels that transduce mechanical forces into the entry of calcium into blood vessels and in skeletal muscle and contribute to vascular regulation and muscle degeneration in muscular dystrophy. His research led to a new understanding of the contribution of ion transport to the pathology skeletal and heart muscle in degenerative disease.

Career
Lansman studied biology at Purchase College (B.A.), and Tufts University (M.S.) and subsequently received a Ph.D. in physiology and biophysics at UCLA School of Medicine under  Susumu Hagiwara. He went on to complete postdoctoral training at the Yale Medical School and the Physiological Laboratory at the University of Cambridge.

He joined the faculty of the Department of Pharmacology at UCSF School of Medicine as an assistant professor where he received tenure as Associate and then Professor of Cellular & Molecular Pharmacology.

In 2017, he founded Turex Marine Biopharma to explore the marine biome and discover next generation drugs for treating neurodegenerative diseases.

Most cited papers

Hess, P., Lansman, J.B. and Tsien, R.W. (1984) Different modes of calcium channel gating behavior favored by dihydropyridine agonists and antagonists. Nature 311:538-544. (Cited 1533 times, according to Google Scholar.)
Nilius, B., Hess, P., Lansman, J.B. and Tsien, R.W. (1985) A novel type of cardiac calcium channel in ventricular cells. Nature 316:443-446. (Cited 900 times, according to Google Scholar.)
Lansman, J.B., Hallam, T.J. and Rink, T.J. (1987) Single stretch-activated ion channels in vascular endothelial cells as mechanotransducers? Nature 325:811-813. (Cited 888 times, according to Google Scholar.)
Hess, P., Lansman, J.B. and Tsien, R.W. (1986) Calcium channel selectivity for divalent and monovalent cations. Voltage and concentration dependence of single channel current in ventricular heart cells. Journal of General Physiology 88:293-319. (Cited 656 times, according to Google Scholar.)
Lansman, J.B., Hess, P. and Tsien, R.W. (1986) Blockade of current through single calcium channels by Cd, Mg, and Ca. Voltage-and concentration-dependence of Ca entry into the pore. Journal of General Physiology 88:321-347. (Cited 631 times, according to Google Scholar.)

References 

Living people
1951 births
American neuroscientists
University of California, San Francisco faculty
Tufts University School of Arts and Sciences alumni
UCSF School of Medicine faculty